The Scottish Football Hall of Fame is located at the Scottish Football Museum. Nominations are made each year by fans and a committee selects the inductees. The first inductions to the Hall of Fame were in November 2004 in a ceremony at Hampden Park. Brian Laudrup and Henrik Larsson became the first players from outside Scotland to be inducted, in 2006. Rose Reilly was the first woman to be inducted into the Hall of Fame, in 2007. , there had been 122 inductions to the Hall of Fame.

Members

See also
Scottish FA International Roll of Honour, a list of all Scotland players with more than 50 caps

References

External links
The Scottish Football Museum: Hall of Fame Overview at the Scottish Football Museum
Official website

History of football in Scotland
Association football museums and halls of fame
Halls of fame in Scotland
Football
Awards established in 2004
2004 establishments in Scotland
Scottish football trophies and awards